The Gozitan First Division, known for sponsorship reasons as the BOV GFL First Division, is the top division of the Gozo Football League, the league competition for men's football clubs in Gozo.

The GFL First Division is played on three rounds where each team plays each other once, with a total of 21 games played in total by each team, usually held between the months of September and April. Teams are ranked by total points, then goal difference, and then goals scored. At the end of each season, the club with the most points is crowned league champion, while the bottom club is relegated to the Second Division. A relegation play-off match takes place between the seventh-placed team in the First Division and the second-placed team in the Second Division, with the winner securing a place in the following season's First Division.

The majority of matches are played at the Gozo Stadium.

Clubs

2022–23 season

List of winners by season

Performance by club 

 Clubs participating in the 2019–20 Gozo First Division are denoted in bold type
 Clubs no longer active are denoted in italics

Notes

League appearances

References

External links 
 Gozo Football Association official website

1
competitions
Gozo